Sequoyah, or Sequoya, is a bronze sculpture depicting the Cherokee silversmith and inventor of the same name by Vinnie Ream (and completed by George Julian Zolnay), installed in the United States Capitol's National Statuary Hall, as part of the National Statuary Hall Collection. The statue was given by the U.S. state of Oklahoma in 1917.

See also
 1917 in art

References

External links
 

1917 establishments in Washington, D.C.
1917 sculptures
Bronze sculptures in Washington, D.C.
Monuments and memorials in Washington, D.C.
Sequoyah
Sculptures by Vinnie Ream
Sculptures of men in Washington, D.C.
Sculptures of Native Americans in Washington, D.C.